Three Futures is the third studio album by Torres (née Mackenzie Scott), released on September 29, 2017, on 4AD Records. The album was recorded in England. As with Torres' last album Sprinter, Three Futures was produced by Rob Eliis. The album was mixed by David Tolomel.

Production
Three Futures was recorded in Stockport and Dorset, England once again with co-producer Rob Ellis, who also produced her last album, Sprinter. David Tolomei was chosen to mix the album.

Artwork
The album cover prominently features an example of the at the time frequented satirized manspreading trend. Torres explained it reminded her of the idea that “men take up more space”.

Track listing
All tracks written by Mackenzie Scott, except where noted

Personnel 
 Mackenzie Scott – vocals, guitar, drum programming, synthesizer, producer
 Rob Ellis – electronic drums, synthesizer, drum programming, producer 
 Chris Hamilton - synthesizer, drum machine, electronics, engineer
 Dahm Majuri Cipolla - drums, electronics
 Cameron Kapoor – guitar, synthesizer, electronics
 Adrian Utley – synthesizer  
 Erin Manning – synthesizer, keyboards, electronics
 Ben Christophers – synthesizer, omnichord, electronics
 Henry Broadhead – engineer
 Heba Kadry – mastering
 David Tolomei – mixing

References

External links
Futures-by-Torres-cd-lp 4AD Records' page on Three Futures

2017 albums
Torres (musician) albums
4AD albums